Daniel Hoyt (also Daniel Hoit) (January 1, 1681 – August 13, 1764)  was a member of the House of Representatives of the Colony of Connecticut from Norwalk in the session of October 1734.

He was the son of Zerrubabel Hoyt and Hannah Knapp. He was the grandson of Walter Hoyt, the Norwalk settler.

References 

1681 births
1764 deaths
Deacons
Members of the Connecticut House of Representatives
Politicians from Norwalk, Connecticut